George William Gray  (4 September 1926 – 12 May 2013) was a Professor of Organic Chemistry at the University of Hull who was instrumental in developing the long-lasting materials which made liquid crystal displays possible. He created and systematically developed liquid crystal materials science, and established a method of practical molecular design. Gray was recipient of the 1995 Kyoto Prize in Advanced Technology.

Education and career
Born in Denny, Scotland, Gray was educated at the University of Glasgow and while working as an assistant lecturer at the University College in Hull (then part of the University of London) obtained his PhD in 1953.

He developed his academic career at the college, which became the University of Hull in 1954, from 1946 to 1990. He was appointed senior lecturer in 1960, Professor of Organic Chemistry in 1974, and GF Grant Professor of Chemistry in 1984. He remained an Emeritus Professor at Hull.

In 1990 he joined the chemical company Merck, then became an independent consultant in 1996.

Liquid crystals

In 1973, in conjunction with the Royal Radar Establishment, he showed that 4-Cyano-4'-pentylbiphenyl possessed a stable nematic phase at room temperature. This compound and other long-lasting cyano-biphenyls made the twisted nematic display (LCD) popular. Gray wrote the first English book covering the subject of liquid crystals, "Molecular Structure and Properties of Liquid Crystals", published in 1962.

Gray was recipient of the 1995 Kyoto Prize in Advanced Technology and was made a Commander of the Order of the British Empire (CBE) in 1991. He was elected a Fellow of the Royal Society in 1983, and in 1987 was awarded the Leverhulme Medal of the Royal Society. In 1979 he was awarded the Rank Prize for Opto-electronics and in 1996 the SID Karl Ferdinand Braun Prize. The University of Hull was the first university to be awarded the Queen's Award for Technological Achievement, in 1979, for the liquid crystal joint-development work. Gray has been a Director of the International Liquid Crystal Society.  Members of the British Liquid Crystal Society honoured his achievements by establishing the George W. Gray Medal for contributions to liquid crystal research and technology.

In March 2013, the University of Hull celebrated the 40th anniversary of Gray's seminal paper being published on 22 March 1973.

Hull Trains named their first British Rail Class 222 'Pioneer' high-speed train Professor George Gray in recognition of his achievements in the modern history of Hull.

Private life
In 1953 George Gray married Marjorie Canavan, who died two weeks before her husband. They lived in Furzehill in Wimborne Minster in Dorset.  They had three daughters.

References

Further reading
 
 David Dunmur & Tim Sluckin (2011) Soap, Science, and Flat-screen TVs: a history of liquid crystals, pp 201,221–5, Oxford University Press

External links
The History of Liquid Crystals at the University of Hull
George William Gray, Kyoto Prize biography
George William Gray, Kyoto Prize citation
George Gray - Liquid Perfection
Interview With George Gray, The Vega Science Trust
The history of liquid-crystal displays, Hirohisa Kawamoto, Proceedings of the IEEE, Vol. 90, No. 4, April 2002
G. W. Gray, K. J. Harrison, J. A. Nash "New family of nematic liquid crystals for displays" Electronics Lett. 9 (1973) 130
Celebrating 40 years of LCD research, University of Hull

1926 births
2013 deaths
Fellows of the Royal Society
Academics of the University of Hull
Alumni of the University of Glasgow
Alumni of the University of London
Commanders of the Order of the British Empire
People from Denny, Falkirk
Liquid crystals
Organic chemists
Scottish chemists
Kyoto laureates in Advanced Technology